Moana (which means Ocean in some Polynesian languages) may refer to:

Entertainment
 "Moana", a song by Deftones from the 2003 album Deftones
 Moana (1926 film), a documentary
 Moana (2016 film), a Disney animated film about a Polynesian girl
 Moana (character), the protagonist of the film.
 Moana (soundtrack), the soundtrack to the 2016 Disney film
 Moana (miniseries), a 2009 miniseries based on the life of adult film actress Moana Pozzi

People
 House of Moana, Hawaiian nobility
 Moana (singer) (born 1961), lead singer of the New Zealand band "Moana and the Moahunters"
 Moana Hope (born 1988), Australian rules footballer and Australian Survivor contestant
 Moana Jackson (1945–2022), New Zealand lawyer
 Moana Pozzi (1961–1994), Italian pornographic actress

Places
 Marae Moana, an ocean sanctuary
 Moana Pool, a sports complex in Dunedin, New Zealand
 Moaña, a municipality of Spain
 Moana, Nelson, a suburb of Nelson, New Zealand
 Moana, New Zealand, a settlement on the West Coast
 Moana, South Australia, a beachside suburb of Adelaide

Other uses
 Moana (cicada), a genus of cicadas in the family Cicadidae
 Moana (fungus), a fungus genus
 Moana Radio, a New Zealand radio station
 Moana wrestling, a type of folk wrestling in French Polynesia
 Moana, an unofficial Amiga bootloader from Acube

See also 
 Ala Moana, a district of Honolulu, Hawaii
Ala Moana Center, the largest shopping mall in Hawaii
Moai, monolithic human figures on Easter Island
Mona (disambiguation)
 Te Moana, a locality in South Island of New Zealand